Sean Maher (born 19 May 1953) is a British former swimmer. He competed at the 1972 Summer Olympics and the 1976 Summer Olympics.

References

External links
 

1953 births
Living people
British male swimmers
Olympic swimmers of Great Britain
Swimmers at the 1972 Summer Olympics
Swimmers at the 1976 Summer Olympics
Place of birth missing (living people)